= Medal of March 1, 1881 =

The Medal of March 1, 1881 (Russian: Медаль «1 марта 1881 года») is a state commemorative medal of the Russian Empire. It was established on March 1, 1881, to commemorate the assassination attempt against Alexander II of Russia, which ultimately led to his death. This medal was awarded to individuals who were present during the assassination of Alexander II and tried to protect the emperor and the doctors wo tried to save his life. It was established on March 12, 1881, by decree of Alexander III. On May 28, 1881, the medal was transferred to the General Staff of the armed forces for future awards.

== Award Criteria ==
The medal is associated with the tragic assassination attempt on March 1, 1881, against Alexander II. Initially, upon the recommendation of Mikhail Nikolaevich, Prince of the Caucasus, 140 medals were awarded.

The medal was awarded to:

- All Cossacks who accompanied Alexander II during his visit to the Caucasus.
- Witnesses, survivors, and those injured by the explosion (56 individuals, including one woman, Yevdokiya Davydova, and a soldier who sustained an injury to his right arm).
- Certain sailors from the 8th fleet (26 individuals) and cadets from the 1st Junker Pavel Military School.

Thus, the medal was awarded to:

- Doctors who attempted to save Alexander II’s life, including S. B. Bontikny, N. A. Kruglevsky, E. A. Golovinyun, and E. I. Bogdanov.
- Other individuals considered worthy of the medal for one reason or another.

== Medal Description ==
The medal is made of silver and has a diameter of 28 mm. The obverse features Alexander II's monogram, topped by the imperial crown. The reverse bears the date of the assassination attempt:

- 1 March 1881

== Wearing the Medal ==
The medal could be attached to a shoulder bar or ribbon. It was worn on the chest, with a distinctive ribbon type.

== Literature ==
- N. I. Chepurnov (2000). Award Medals of the Russian State. Moscow: Russian World. p. 496. ISBN 5-89577-024-X.
- D. I. Peters (2002). Award Medals of Russia during the Reign of Emperor Alexander III (1881 - 1894). Moscow: Ancient Archive. pp. 59–61. ISBN 5-93646-026-6.
- V. V. Bitkin (2008). Unified Catalogue of Russian Medals. Award Medals for Wearing, Part 2 (1801-1917). Kiev: Yunona-Moneta. p. 708.
